Bangladesh Wheat and Maize Research Institute is a Bangladesh government owned research institute that researches wheat and maize. It is located in Nashipur, Dinajpur District, Bangladesh. Dr Golam Faruq is the director general of Bangladesh Wheat and Maize Research Institute. It had received the Independence Day Award, the highest civilian award in Bangladesh, for research in 2022.

History 
Wheat Research Centre was established in 1984 under the Bangladesh Agricultural Research Institute. Prime Minister Sheikh Hasina announced plans to transform it independent research institute. In 2006, research on maize was added to the institute. In 2017, the parliament of Bangladesh passed Bangladesh Wheat and Maize Research Institute Bill, which established the Bangladesh Wheat and Maize Research Institute to research wheat and maize. The institute has seven regional stations.

In 2020, scientists at the institute developed two varieties of wheat that had resistance to Magnaporthe grisea.

On 13 July 2021, Dr Md Amiruzzaman was appointed the 4th Director General of Bangladesh Wheat and Maize Research Institute. The former chief scientific officer of the institute, Anwar Shaheed, was murdered in Dhaka on 12 November 2021.

In 2022, Bangladesh Wheat and Maize Research Institute was awarded the Independence Day Award for research.

References 

2017 establishments in Bangladesh
Organisations based in Dinajpur
Research institutes in Bangladesh
Government-owned companies of Bangladesh
Recipients of the Independence Day Award